The Vancouver Meralomas football team was a Canadian football team that played in the British Columbia Rugby Football Union and the Western Canada Rugby Football Union from 1926 to 1938. The team was part of the popular and successful Meraloma Club. The Meralomas also fielded championship junior football sides for many decades.

The Meralomas were a very successful team, winning 5 championships in 13 seasons.

In 1926 the Meralomas were awarded the Harry Duker Cup for being Senior City Champions. In 1927 the team entered the Senior City League for the second time, winning the Harry Duker Cup again, but lost the Provincial Championship. Additionally, the team was a magnet for the best junior talent in Vancouver, benefiting from their rival's, the New Westminster Dodekas, program.

BCRFU season-by-season

References

Defunct Canadian football teams
Canadian football teams in Vancouver